Blepharomastix marialis is a moth in the family Crambidae. It was described by William Schaus in 1924. It is found in Guatemala.

The wingspan is about 20 mm. The forewings are drab with darker markings. The hindwings are white, thinly scaled and the termen suffused with drab. There is a brown postmedial wavy line.

References

Moths described in 1924
Blepharomastix